Kille may refer to:

 Kille, Netherlands, a hamlet in the municipality of Altena
 Kille (card game), a Swedish card game of the Cuckoo family